Ceprano Man, Argil, and Ceprano Calvarium, refers to a Middle Pleistocene archaic human fossil, a single skull cap (calvaria), accidentally unearthed in a highway construction project in 1994 near Ceprano in the province of Frosinone, Italy. Although damaged by a bulldozer it was recognized, documented and described by archeologist Italo Biddittu, who happened to be present when the fossil came to light. and Mallegni et al. (2003) proposed the introduction of a new human species, dubbed Homo cepranensis, based on the fossil. although other paleontologists have classified it as belonging to Homo heidelbergensis. Mounier et al. (2011) have identified the fossil as "an appropriate ancestral stock" of H. heidelbergensis, "preceding the appearance of regional autapomorphic features". It is associated specifically with H. rhodesiensis.

The holotype (see image) of Homo cepranenis has a unique combination of morphological features:
1: incomplete sulcus supraorbitalis, 2: frontal tuber weakly developed medially shifted, 3: supraorbital region medially concave, 4: intermediate position of the external auditory meatus in regard to the processus zygomaticus temporalis); 5 and 6 (blue) = more derived traits (i.e. 5: straight torus occipitalis transversus, 6: medio-lateral concavity of the articular tubercle); 7 to 10 (green) = more primitive traits (i.e. 7: petro-tympanic crest orientated downward, 8: opisthocranion coincident with inion, 9: processus retromastoideus, 10: torus angularis parietalis.

The fossil was first estimated to be between 690,000 to 900,000 years old determined on the basis of regional correlations and a series of absolute dates. 
(2009) suggested that Ceprano is most likely about 450,000 years old - the mid of the Middle Pleistocene. 

The cranial features on the bone seem to be intermediate between those found on Homo erectus and those of later species, such as Homo heidelbergensis, that dominated Europe long before Homo neanderthalensis. A 2011 study suggested that it was ancestral to Homo neanderthalensis.

Significant traits

Features 1 to 4 (black) traits that are more exclusive of Mid-Pleistocene specimens, i.e.
 1: incomplete sulcus supraorbitalis,
 2: frontal tuber weakly developed medially shifted,
 3: supraorbital region medially concave,
 4: intermediate position of the external auditory meatus in regard to the processus zygomaticus temporalis;

Features 5 and 6 (blue) = more derived traits, i.e.
 5: straight torus occipitalis transversus,
 6: medio-lateral concavity of the articular tubercle; 

Features 7 to 10 (green) = more primitive traits, i.e.
 7: petro-tympanic crest orientated downward,
 8: opisthocranion coincident with inion,
 9: processus retromastoideus, 10: torus angularis parietalis.

See also
 Middle Pleistocene
 Archaic humans

References

External links
 Human Timeline (Interactive) – Smithsonian, National Museum of Natural History (August 2016).

Early species of Homo
Homo heidelbergensis fossils
Lower Paleolithic
Paleolithic Europe
Fossil taxa described in 2003
Prehistoric Italy
People from the Province of Frosinone
Archaeological discoveries in Italy
1994 in Italy
1994 archaeological discoveries
1994 in paleontology
Fossils of Italy